is the popular anthem of the Spanish football club Real Madrid. It was written by RedOne and Manuel Jabois and released in celebration of Real Madrid's 10th win (La Décima) of the UEFA Champions League in 2014. It was recorded by Real Madrid squad for the 2014 final. It reached number one in the Spanish chart after the win. The anthem is now regularly played at the Santiago Bernabéu Stadium with fans chanting the chorus, and a short clip of the tune is played in celebration whenever Real Madrid score a goal at the stadium.

Background
The song was commissioned by the president of Real Madrid Florentino Pérez.
According to composer Nadir Khayat (RedOne), he is a Real Madrid fan and had always wanted to write something for the club. He had the idea for the tune of the song while travelling on a plane between Madrid and Morocco four years before it was recorded. He wanted the song to be "more classic and symphonic", with a memorable tune that fans can chant to.  He programmed and recorded the symphonic part in Sweden before working on the production. The lyrics were written by journalist . Jabois originally wrote a longer version but truncated it to fit the tune.

The track is titled "¡Hala Madrid! ...y nada más"; the "Hala Madrid" in the title is a battle cry traditionally associated with the club and often chanted by fans and players of the club alike. "Hala" has been suggested to be a word of Arabic origin meaning "Go" or "Come on" and used to encourage the team.  "¡Hala Madrid!" is the title of Real Madrid's official anthem (also commonly known as "Las mocitas madrileñas" after a line in the lyrics) commissioned by former president Santiago Bernabéu, which was written by Luis Cisneros Galiane in 1952 and recorded by José de Aguilar. "Hala Madrid" is also used in the centenary anthem ("Himno del centenario") recorded in 2002 by Plácido Domingo. For the "y nada más" ("and nothing more") part of the title, Jabois explained that "it sums up a bit what Madrid is, either you love it or… ".

The new anthem "Hala Madrid y nada más"  was recorded in April 2014 by the squad of the Real Madrid including Cristiano Ronaldo, Sergio Ramos, Karim Benzema, Gareth Bale, Luka Modrić and Marcelo, as well as their manager Carlo Ancelotti. After it was recorded, the song was played to the team before the games against Barcelona in the 2014 Copa del Rey Final and against Bayern Munich and Atlético Madrid in the Champions League games to motivate the players.  The song was released for sale to the public the day after the 10th win of the Champions League, and it was played during the celebration at the Santiago Bernabéu Stadium. The song is now regularly played and sung by fans at the stadium before matches. The playback of the song's chorus is usually silenced to allow the voice of fans singing to dominate. A clip of the song is also used whenever a Real Madrid player scores a goal at the Bernabéu.

A cover was recorded by Plácido Domingo and the team in 2016 and released to commemorate Real Madrid's 11th win of the Champions League.

Commercial performance
The song reached number one on the iTunes chart in Spain and 17 countries around the world, including Costa Rica, the Czech Republic, Ecuador, El Salvador, Guatemala, Honduras, Hungary, Israel, Mexico, Panama, Peru, Slovakia, and Sweden after Real Madrid won the Champions League in 2014.

Charts

Weekly charts

Year-end charts

References

External links
 – Real Madrid Official YouTube channel

Real Madrid CF
2014 singles
2014 songs
RedOne songs
Football songs and chants
Spanish-language songs
Number-one singles in Spain